St. Francis Episcopal School, formerly St. Francis Episcopal Day School, is a private Episcopal school located on two campuses in the City of Piney Point Village and the Memorial area of Houston, Texas, United States. In fall 2018, St. Francis opened a high school on the Couper Campus (2300 S. Piney Point Rd., Houston, TX 77063) with its inaugural freshman class graduating in May 2022.  The Piney Point Campus and affiliated parish, located at 335 Piney Point Rd., house the lower and middle schools. The Couper Campus is home to primary and upper school facilities, along with athletic fields used by the middle school. With over 900 students, St. Francis Episcopal School was once the largest K–8 Episcopal parish day school in the United States. In the 1998–1999 school year, St. Francis was named a National Blue Ribbon School.

History and facilities

A coeducational school, St. Francis was founded in 1952 as a mission of St. Francis Episcopal Church. For its first year, it welcomed a class of 24 preschoolers and gradually expanded into elementary education. In 1965, Sarah W. Woolrich, who originally joined St. Francis faculty in 1959 as a first-grade teacher, was named St. Francis's first head of school. The current interim head of school is Donald C. North.

The school continued to expand and by 1973 included sixth-grade classes. Between 1978 and 1985, capital campaigns funded the construction of a gymnasium, dining hall, additional classrooms, and the Sarah W. Woolrich Education Building. In 1997, the school added an Outdoor Activity Center and in 2001 opened a new Lower School Building, library, Fine Arts Center, and technology center, along with a renovated dining hall, gymnasium, and common area. The Woods Outdoor Classroom was established in 2011.

The school had renovated the dining hall in 2022 to make it more modern and updated, along with some other improvements to the interior of the school.

The Parish Hall, established in 1952, was demolished in 2022, to make a new, updated Parish Hall for St. Francis Episcopal Church.

The Student Life Building on the Couper Campus is expected to be completed by spring.

Today, the school serves students from age 2 years through 12th grade on two sites - the original Piney Point Campus and Couper Campus - together totaling 39 acres providing ample room for the school's 600-seat state-of-the-art Fine Arts Center, 7,000-square-foot library and technology center, and nine acres of regulation playing fields for a wide variety of sports.

Leadership and accreditation

Since its founding, St. Francis has been led by five heads of school: Sarah Woolrich (1965–1986); Dr. Kay P. Walther (1986–1993); Dr. Annette Smith (1994–2000); Dr. Susan Lair (2001-2017); and Stephen Lovejoy (2017-2022). Donald C. North currently serves as interim head of school. Dr. Chelsea Pope Collins will serve as the head of school, effective in July 2023. 

St. Francis Episcopal School is accredited by the Southwestern Association of Episcopal Schools and the Independent Schools Association of the Southwest.

In addition, the school is a member of the following organizations including: 
 ACT
Association for Childhood Education International
Association of College Counselors in Independent Schools
 Association for Supervision and Curriculum Development
College Board
 Council for Advancement and Support of Education
 Houston Area Independent Schools
 International Reading Association
 National Association for College Admission Counseling
 National Association for the Education of Young Children
 National Association of Episcopal Schools
 National Association of Elementary School Principals
 National Association of Independent Schools
 National Association of Secondary School Principals
 National Association of Student Councils
 National Council for the Social Studies
 National Middle School Association
 National Council of Teachers of Mathematics
 National Junior Honor Society
 National Middle School Association
 North American Reggio Emilia Alliance
 Texas Association for College Admission Counseling
 Texas Association of Non-Public Schools
 Texas Library Association
 Texas Music Educators Association
 Texas Nonprofits

Athletics

St. Francis Episcopal School is a member of the Houston Junior Preparatory Conference (HJPC) and has won 32 conference championships including: Football 2003, 2006, 2008, 2011, 2019; Cross-Country 2006; Field Hockey 2002; Volleyball 2011, 2015, 2016; Boys Basketball 2008–09, 2011–12, 2013–14; Girls Soccer 2000–01; Wrestling 2003–04, 2004–05, 2005–06; Softball 2004, 2007, 2010, 2012; Baseball 2013; Boys Lacrosse 2007, 2012, 2014; Track and Field 2002, 2022 (Boys); Boys Tennis 2015; Boys Golf 2018, 2019; and Girls Basketball 2020-21. Starting in the 2022-23, St. Francis's high school sports became part of TAPPS.

Notable alumni
Wes Anderson, award-winning filmmaker (Golden Globe, Oscar nomination)
Charles Andrew Doyle, Episcopal Bishop
Leven Rambin, actress
Amir Taghi, fashion designer
Stephen Wrabel, musician

References

External links

 St. Francis Episcopal School

Private K-12 schools in Harris County, Texas
Private high schools in Houston
Private schools in Houston
Episcopal schools in the United States
Independent Schools Association of the Southwest